The Fall of a Nation is a 1916 American silent drama film directed by Thomas Dixon Jr., and a sequel to the 1915 film The Birth of a Nation, directed by D. W. Griffith. Dixon, Jr. attempted to cash in on the success of the controversial first film. The Fall of a Nation is considered to be the first ever feature-length film sequel, though it was predated by short film sequels such as The Little Train Robbery and Sherlock Holmes II: Raffles Escaped from Prison. Based upon Dixon's novel The Fall of a Nation, the film is now lost, although the complete score survives.

Plot
The Fall of a Nation is an attack on the pacifism of William Jennings Bryan and Henry Ford and a plea for American preparedness for war.

America is unprepared for an attack by the "European Confederated Army", a European army headed by Germany. The army invades America and executes children and war veterans. Charles Waldron, a millionaire collaborator, accepts a title as prince of a puppet government. However, America is saved by pro-war Congressman John Vassar who raises an army to defeat the invaders with the support of the suffragette Virginia Holland. Holland forms the "Daughters of Jael," who seduce and then kill the soldiers of the occupation force. Eventually the insurgency gains the upper hand and drives out the Europeans.

Cast
Lorraine Huling as Virginia Holland
Percy Standing as Charles Waldron/Prince Karl Von Waldron
Arthur Shirley as John Vassar
 Flora Macdonald as Angela Benda
Paul Willis as Billy
Phil Gastrock as Thomas 
Clarence Geldart as General Arnold

Production
Some battle scenes were filmed in the same location as The Birth of a Nation, at a cost of $31,000.

Soundtrack
The film had a musical score produced by Victor Herbert. The Encyclopædia Britannica states that "this is probably the first original symphonic score composed for a feature film". An earlier music score was composed by Camille Saint-Saëns for the short (15-minute) film The Assassination of the Duke of Guise (1908); the complete soundtrack is available on YouTube.

Reception and aftermath
Anthony Slide argues that the film was largely a commercial failure. The film was widely shown as propaganda by Allied governments in Europe during World War I, especially the Russian Empire. The production company, Dixon Studios, went bust in 1921, having produced only this film.

See also
The Birth of a Nation
The Fall of a Nation (novel)
List of lost films
Invasion literature

References

External links

 
 Progressive Silent Film List: The Fall of a Nation at silentera.com

1916 films
1916 drama films
Silent American drama films
American silent feature films
American black-and-white films
Films based on American novels
Films based on works by Thomas Dixon Jr.
Lost American films
American sequel films
Films directed by Thomas Dixon Jr.
1916 lost films
Lost drama films
1910s American films
1910s English-language films